Giovanni Plazzer (30 September 1909 in Koper, Austria-Hungary – 23 June 1983) was an Italian rower. He was a member of the silver medallion Italian coxed fours boat in the 1932 Summer Olympics.

External links
 profile

1909 births
1983 deaths
Sportspeople from Koper
Italian male rowers
Olympic rowers of Italy
Rowers at the 1932 Summer Olympics
Olympic silver medalists for Italy
Olympic medalists in rowing
Medalists at the 1932 Summer Olympics